Brudner may refer to:

Brudner Prize, awards contributions to the field of lesbian and gay studies
Harvey Jerome Brudner (1931–2009), Kilmer scholar